Prymorske is a village in Vasylivka Raion, Ukraine.

Populated places on the Dnieper in Ukraine

Villages in Vasylivka Raion